Commerson Crater is a caldera in the mountains of Réunion, an overseas department of France. Located in the municipal territory of Saint-Joseph, it is part of the Piton de la Fournaise, a shield volcano on the eastern end of Réunion Island, but is located outside of the Enclos Fouqué, the volcano's most recent caldera.

The caldera was named in honor of Philibert Commerson, a French explorer.

Climate
Due to its elevated position, Commerson Crater receives considerable amounts of rainfall, especially during tropical storms. During Cyclone Hyacinthe in January 1980, it received  of rainfall in 15 days, the most precipitation dropped by a tropical cyclone in a single location. The second greatest amount of rainfall in a single tropical cyclone also occurred in Commerson Crater, when Cyclone Gamede dropped  of rain in 2007. Nowhere else has received even  of rainfall from a single tropical cyclone.

References

Shield volcanoes of France
Hotspot volcanoes
Extinct volcanoes
Volcanoes of Réunion
Mountains of Réunion
Polygenetic shield volcanoes
Calderas of Réunion